This article summarizes the events, album releases, and album release dates in hip hop music for the year 2016.

Events

January
On January 20, Yasiin Bey (formerly known as Mos Def) was arrested in South Africa for allegedly using an unrecognized World Passport, thus having lived there illegally since 2014. Bey then released his newest freestyle via Kanye West's website for West's GOOD Fridays series, announcing he would soon be retiring from music and films, following his album.

February
In February 2016, Future became the fastest artist (less than seven months) to chart three number-one albums on the Billboard 200 since Glee soundtrack albums in 2010.
On February 3, American Hip Hop DJ Big Kap who was part of  New York city DJ Group The Flip Squad died due to a fatal heart attack at the age of 45.
On February 22, T.I. announced he signed a distribution deal with Jay Z's Roc Nation company. T.I. also revealed he is one of the new co-owners of online streaming service, TIDAL.

March
On March 4, rapper Bankroll Fresh was shot and killed in Atlanta, Georgia.
On March 22, rapper Phife Dawg from A Tribe Called Quest died from complications due to diabetes.

April 
 On April 23, Beyonce released her second visual album Lemonade on HBO.

May
On May 11, French Montana previewed a single called "No Shopping" featuring Drake, which ignited a feud between the latter and Joe Budden
On May 26, rapper Gucci Mane was released from prison after serving two years for possession of a fire arm by a convicted Felon. He was slated to be released in September this year. The same day that rapper Troy Ave was involved in a shooting at Irving Plaza during a T.I. concert that left three people injured, including Troy Ave, and one dead. Footage later revealed Ave accidentally shot himself in the leg, his bodyguard BSB Banga, and two other people. He was later arrested for his role in the incident.

June
On June 13, Lil Wayne suffered multiple seizures on a flight, which forced an emergency landing in Omaha, Nebraska. He was released from hospital a day later, recovering and in stable condition.
On June 13, the 2016 XXL Freshman Class was revealed, consisting of 21 Savage, Lil Uzi Vert, Kodak Black, Lil Yachty, Lil Dicky, Denzel Curry, G Herbo, Dave East, Desiigner, and Anderson .Paak.
On June 30, Joe Budden released his first of many diss records aimed at Drake entitled Making A Murderer Part 1

July 
 On July 17, Kim Kardashian used Snapchat to expose Taylor Swift over the use of her name in the song "Famous" by Kanye West.

August
On August 11, Young Buck was sentenced to seven months in prison for violating terms of his release and probation.
On August 17, YG inked a multi-million-dollar deal with Interscope Records for his newly founded label 4Hunnid Records.
On August 28, Teyana Taylor danced and starred in the video for "Fade" off Kanye West's The Life of Pablo album.

September
On September 7, Kanye West announced that he had signed Tyga and Migos to GOOD Music. Though it was later noted that Migos' deal with GOOD Music is only a management deal, not a recording contract.
On September 16, The Game released his first of many diss records aimed at Meek Mill. 
On September 21, Shawty Lo was killed in a single-car accident in Fulton County, Georgia.
On September 30, Solange Knowles released A Seat at The Table featuring artists like Q-Tip, The-Dream, and Lil Wayne. This also marked the first #1 album of her career.

October
On October 4, Kid Cudi announced that he has checked into rehab for depression and suicidal urges.
On October 22, Beyoncé and her sister Solange Knowles made history by being added to a very short list of siblings with #1 albums on Billboards 200 list in the same calendar year.

November
On November 20, Kanye West was committed into UCLA Medical Center for paranoia and hallucinations after cancelling the remainder of his Saint Pablo tour. He would go on to be released from the hospital on November 30.

December
 On December 5, Big Syke was pronounced dead. He was believed to have passed by natural causes, although his autopsy has never been released to the public.
 On December 23, Paul Wall and Baby Bash were arrested for delivering and manufacturing a controlled substance in Houston, Texas.

Released albums

Highest-charting singles

Highest first-week consumption

All critically reviewed albums Ranked

Metacritic

AnyDecentMusic?

See also
Previous article: 2015 in hip hop music
Next article: 2017 in hip hop music

References

2010s in hip hop music
Hip hop
Hip hop music by year